The men's shot put at the 2011 European Athletics U23 Championships was held at the Městský stadion on 14 July.

Medalists

Schedule

Results

Qualification
Qualification: Qualification Performance 18.30 (Q) or at least 12 best performers advance to the final.

Final

Participation
According to an unofficial count, 19 athletes from 15 countries participated in the event.

References

External links

Shot M
Shot put at the European Athletics U23 Championships